Solonovka is a rural locality (a selo) and the administrative center of Solonovsky Selsoviet, Smolensky District, Altai Krai, Russia. The population was 1,268 as of 2013. There are 18 streets.

Geography 
Solonovka is located 64 km southwest of Smolenskoye (the district's administrative centre) by road. Krasny Gorodok is the nearest rural locality.

References 

Rural localities in Smolensky District, Altai Krai